Tom Cartmill (born in Ashton-Under-Lyne, 1965) is a contemporary English painter, currently living in Reading, UK. His abstract mixed media paintings focus on the themes of the passage of time and visual perception.

References

External links
Artist's web site

20th-century English painters
English male painters
21st-century English painters
Living people
1965 births
Artists from Reading, Berkshire
People from Ashton-under-Lyne
20th-century English male artists
21st-century English male artists